Andrew Hodge is an Australian former professional rugby league footballer who played in the 1990s. He played for the Gold Coast Seagulls in 1995 and the Newcastle Knights in 1996.

Playing career
Hodge made his first grade debut for the Gold Coast against North Sydney at North Sydney Oval in Round 1 1995 which ended in a 50–10 loss.  

In 1996, Hodge joined Newcastle and made only 2 appearances. His final game in first grade was a 34–30 loss against St George in Round 3 1996.

References

Australian rugby league players
Gold Coast Chargers players
Newcastle Knights players
Living people
Year of birth missing (living people)
Place of birth missing (living people)
Rugby league wingers